1-9 may refer to:

0s, the first "decade" of the AD/CE time system (AD 1–9)
1% rule (Internet culture), also known as the 1–9–90 rule
Two services of the New York City Subway which formerly ran together
1 (New York City Subway service)
9 (New York City Subway service)
U.S. Route 1/9 concurrency in northern New Jersey
Emergency telephone number for city police in Morocco

See also
1/9 (disambiguation)